Finn Martin Vallersnes (born 27 December 1945 in Haugesund) is a Norwegian politician for the Conservative Party.

He was elected to the Norwegian Parliament from Rogaland in 2001, and has been re-elected on one occasion. He had previously served in the position of deputy representative during the terms 1985–1989 and 1989–1993.

Vallersnes was a member of Haugesund municipality council from 1979 to 1991, and served as mayor from 1995 to 2001.

References

1945 births
Living people
Conservative Party (Norway) politicians
Members of the Storting
21st-century Norwegian politicians